Artur Rogowski (born 20 January 1936) is a Polish former sports shooter. He competed in the skeet event at the 1972 Summer Olympics.

References

1936 births
Living people
Polish male sport shooters
Olympic shooters of Poland
Shooters at the 1972 Summer Olympics
Sportspeople from Lviv
People from Lwów Voivodeship
20th-century Polish people